The System Within is a 2006 film directed by Dale Resteghini and starring Chingy, Taimak, Kim Porter, Bryce Wilson, Tariq Alexander, and Hawthorne James.

Plot
The film is about an internationally famous model, Tony "Wise" Good (who is played by Tariq Alexander), that fought his way out of the inner city and rocketed straight to the top. But his swift rise to the top didn't take him high enough to protect him from the sudden fall he experiences. The corrupt corporate world, the government's support and participation in that corruption, and the jealousy and greed of people he knew best, all leading to a rapid downward spiral into a living hell.

Cast
Chingy as Nick
Bryce Wilson as Rollins
Taimak as Pastor Ricky
Hawthorne James as Hays
Kim Porter as Hays Girl #2
Tariq Alexander as Tony "Wise" Good

References

External links
 
 Tariq Alexander - at IMDb
DVD on sale at TSW Mall
The System Within on Rotten Tomatoes

2006 films
Hood films
2000s English-language films
2000s American films